Fen Drayton Lakes is a complex of lakes, lagoons, ponds and a river, situated close to Fen Drayton, Holywell and Swavesey in Cambridgeshire, England.
The complex was formerly a gravel extraction site until 1992 when gravel production ceased and the pits were allowed to flood to provide a nature reserve and bird sanctuary.

Waters
All the waters on the complex were created in the process of gravel extraction site which started in 1953 and continued until 1992 when gravel production ceased. The extraction pits naturally filled with water and preserved as a nature reserve and RSPB bird sanctuary. 
The complex consists of 12 waters; Drayton Fen, Ferry lagoon, Ferry pond, Ferry mere, Holywell lake, Swavesey lake, Oxholme Lake, Moore Lake, 
Far Fen lake, Elney Lake, Trout pond, Springhill lagoon, located alongside the River Great Ouse.

Bird species
Since the extraction of gravel began in 1953, at least 213 species have been recorded in the area with some 65 species being regular breeders. 
Recent bird species sighted include barn owl, bittern, blackcap, honey buzzard, common crane, cormorant, great egret, little egret, red-footed falcon, black-headed gull, goldeneye, marsh harrier, purple heron, hobby, glossy ibis, kingfisher, sanderling, snipe, starling, bearded tit, Cetti's warbler, reed warbler, willow warbler, and whiskered tern.

Angling
Fishing is available via syndicate membership on Drayton fen, Ferry lagoon, Holywell lake and Swavesey lake and the water contains specimen carp, bream, tench, roach, rudd, eel and perch. These lakes are prone to flooding and as such fish populations are somewhat of a mystery, 
however, Ferry lagoon is now famous for producing British record sized bream, firstly a bream caught by James Rust of 19lb 10oz in March 2005, then to Mark McKenna of 22lb 9oz in September 2009. 
Both of these were eclipsed by the current British record (to Dec 2017), of 22lb 11oz caught by Scott Crook at Ferry lagoon in April 2012.

References

External links
 Fen Drayton Lakes

River Great Ouse
Royal Society for the Protection of Birds reserves in England
Wildfowl & Wetlands Trust centres
Nature reserves in Cambridgeshire
Fenstanton